Wild at Honey is the second studio album by Japanese rock band Guitar Vader, released in 2000. The album was their first release on Compact Disc, following an album and several short releases on cassette tape. It was named for the Beach Boys album, Wild Honey.

Track listing
"Green & Rock'n'Roll" – 4:13
"Wild At Honey" – 3:36
"Day To Day" - 4:23
"Noku Noku Knock" - 3:50
"Ringo Melody" - 4:35
"S P Y" - 1:50
"Lovely Day" - 4:21

2000 albums
Guitar Vader albums